La soñadora ("The Dreamer") is a 1917 Mexican silent film. It starred Mimí Derba, Eduardo Arozamena and Nelly Fernández, and features Sara García in a very early role as an extra.

External links
 

1917 films
Mexican silent films
1910s romance films
Mexican black-and-white films